is a railway station in the city of Toyama, Toyama Prefecture, Japan, operated by the private railway operator Toyama Chihō Railway.

Lines

Station layout 
The station has one ground-level side platform serving a single bi-directional track. The station is unattended.

History
Kamihori Station was opened on 25 April 1921.

Adjacent stations

Surrounding area 
Kamihori Post Office

Passenger statistics
In fiscal 2015, the station was used by 281 passengers daily.

See also
 List of railway stations in Japan

References

External links

  

Railway stations in Toyama Prefecture
Railway stations in Japan opened in 1921
Stations of Toyama Chihō Railway